Antonín Dvořák composed his String Quartet No. 6 in A minor, B. 40 Op. 12, in November and December 1873, finishing it on 5 December. He later revised it, but at this stage left the work unfinished. After a reconstruction by Jarmil Burghauser, with minimal additions, a first recording was made by the Prager Streichquartett, for Deutsche Grammophon, in March and April 1977.

Background 
The original version of Dvořák's string quartet B.40 was in one continuous movement. On revising it, probably in 1874, Dvořák began to split the music into the conventional four movements, removing one section, the Andante appassionato B. 40a, completely. He did not complete the task. For its first recording in 1977, Jarmil Burghauser found that certain passages were missing, but was able to use analogous portions from elsewhere in the piece. This process is detailed in the sleeve notes of the CD recording and summarised below. The quartet received its performance premiere on 9 October 1990, in Prague, by the Kocian Quartet.

Structure 

In order to complete the work, Burghauser's editorial insertions were as follows

 Allegro ma non troppo: no recapitulation, adapted from exposition
 Second movement ("Scherzo"): first half of the opening section taken from first (rejected) version
 Finale: part of the exposition taken from the recapitulation, and in the transition from development to recapitulation "only a few bars ... were added freely". 
A typical performance of the quartet takes around 32 minutes.

The quartet was printed in 1983 as part of the complete critical edition of Dvořák's works.

Notes

References

External links 
 English language version of page about Dvořák's String Quartet No 6 at a Czech site

Dvorak 06
1862 compositions
Compositions in A minor